Middle Fork Township is an inactive township in Macon County, in the U.S. state of Missouri.

Middle Fork Township took its name from the Middle Fork Salt River.

References

Townships in Missouri
Townships in Macon County, Missouri